Secretory phospholipase A2 receptor is a protein that in humans is encoded by the PLA2R1 gene.

Clinical significance 

M-type phospholipase A2 receptor is the major antigen in idiopathic membranous nephropathy attributed to over 70% of cases.

References

Further reading